Kove/Kaliai Rural LLG is a local-level government (LLG) of West New Britain Province, Papua New Guinea. The Anêm language, a language isolate, is spoken in the LLG.

Wards
01. Kakota
02. Talasea
03. Poitala
04. Kalmaruhi
05. Sisili Sapulo
06. Mongamonga
07. Akivilik
08. Lusi
09. Anemsahe
10. Aria No. 1
11. Aria No. 2
12. Mouk
13. Lamogai

References

Local-level governments of West New Britain Province